Ammonia fungi are fungi that develop fruit bodies exclusively or relatively abundantly on soil that has had ammonia or other nitrogen-containing materials added. The nitrogen materials react as bases by themselves, or after decomposition. The addition of ammonia or urea causes numerous chemical and biological changes, for examples, the pH of soil litter is increased to 8–10; the high alkaline conditions interrupts the process of nutrient recycling. The mechanisms of colonization, establishment, and occurrence of fruiting bodies of ammonia fungi has been researched in the field and the laboratory.

Species

 Ascobolus denudatus
 Calocybe leucocephala
 Coprinopsis cinerea
 Coprinopsis echinospora
 Coprinopsis neolagopus
 Coprinopsis neophlyctidospora
 Coprinopsis phlyctidospora
 Coprinopsis stercorea
 Crucispora rhombisperma
 Hebeloma luchuense
 Hebeloma radicosoides
 Hebeloma radicosum
 Hebeloma spoliatum
 Hebeloma vinosophyllum
 Laccaria amethystina
 Laccaria bicolor
 Sagaranella tylicolor

References

 
Soil biology
Ammonia